Mihai Bravu is a commune in Tulcea County, Northern Dobruja, Romania. It is composed of three villages: Mihai Bravu (formerly Camber), Satu Nou and Turda (formerly Armutlia).

References

Communes in Tulcea County
Localities in Northern Dobruja